International Institute of Information Technology, Naya Raipur (IIIT-NR), formally Dr. Shyama Prasad Mukherjee International Institute of Information Technology, Naya Raipur, is a state funded institute in Naya Raipur, Chhattisgarh, India. The institute is focused in research and development in Information Technology (IT) and associated disciplines.

History
The institute was established by the International Institute of Information Technology University Act, 2013 of the Government of Chhattisgarh, is a joint venture of Government of Chhattisgarh and NTPC Ltd. It is a state university recognized by University Grants Commission, New Delhi.

Academics
IIIT-NR currently runs several undergraduate programs for B.Tech. degree, Postgraduate M. Tech and MS(R) programmes. In addition, it also offers Ph.D programs in various fields.

Student life 
Technovate is a non-profit fest organised by the students of IIIT Naya Raipur. It began as a techno-cultural fest in 2016, and draws thousands of visitors from colleges all over India.The three-day fest held every year in month of March. The fest includes technical events, cultural events, informal events and celebrity night.

References

External links 
 

Government of Chhattisgarh
Engineering colleges in Chhattisgarh
Educational institutions established in 2015
Education in Raipur, Chhattisgarh
2015 establishments in Chhattisgarh